Zazá is a 1997 Brazilian telenovela created by Lauro César Muniz, and starring Fernanda Montenegro. It was broadcast on TV Globo from May 5, 1997 to January 9, 1998.

Plot 
Zazá Dumont (Fernanda Montenegro) is an eccentric millionaire who has a passion for airplanes. She is direct Santos Dumont's descendant, and has a secret project: Build an innovative atomic plane.

Cast

Ratings

References

External links 
 Zazá at Memória Globo

1997 telenovelas
Brazilian telenovelas
Portuguese-language telenovelas
TV Globo telenovelas
1997 Brazilian television series debuts
1998 Brazilian television series endings